Gottfried Schultz GmbH, based in Ratingen, is the largest dealer for the automotive brands owned by Volkswagen Group. The company employs approximately 1,900 people in 26 plants. It distributes and services cars of the marques Volkswagen, Volkswagen Commercial Vehicles, Audi, SEAT, Škoda, Bentley, Porsche and Bugatti.

History
In 1924, Gottfried Schultz (1903-1980) founded in Essen a company dealing in used cars. In the early 1930s he became dealer for Horch. Following the merger of Horch with Audi, Wanderer and DKW to the Auto Union, he also from 1932 led those marques. In 1936 a new building was erected, in which the main operation of the company until 2009 had its headquarters. In 1939, a "main workshops treaty" with the Volkswagen factory GmbH Berlin was signed.

After the end of World War II, the company was faced with the problem that the major trading partners were within the Soviet occupation zone. Schultz began a collaboration with the Wolfsburg Volkswagen plant, for which he initially mediated former Wehrmacht stocks. In 1946 he gained a contract for the supply of the Volkswagen Beetle to the public. In 1949 he founded a first branch in Düsseldorf, sales offices in 1952 in Opladen and Moers and 1958 branch office in Mettmann followed. In 1968, construction in Ratingen-Lintorf built a wholesale distribution center and the headquarters were established.

Company founder Gottfried Schultz died in 1980 at the age of 77 years. With entrepreneurial skill and sense he created the company that still bears his name.

After sales and service of Volkswagen and Audi than 20 years together "under one roof" - the abbreviation for was then called "VAG" -. Was done, the strategy of the producers changed in the late 1980s / early 1990s, now were the model ranges of Volkswagen and Audi have become so extensive that they - if you wanted to give a complete overview buyers -. were next to each other hardly at present still consequently, decided Volkswagen and Audi (as previously Porsche), but also now the Volkswagen Group brands SEAT, Škoda (since 2003) and Bentley (since 2002), the marketing focus on key locations in "centers" or at least on farms of a brand. In 1989 Gottfried Schultz built in Essen the first Audi Centre. in Germany followed - by new or expansion and through acquisition - at Volkswagen, Audi, Seat, Skoda, Bentley or Porsche specialized farms. In Düsseldorf since 2004 came under the leadership of Gottfried Schultz "Auto Höherweg" for more than 20 automobile brands on a  site. Gottfried Schultz is represented on the "Auto Höherweg" with the Volkswagen Zentrum Nordrhein, with a Škoda-operation and with the luxury brand Bentley.

Gottfried Schultz is currently training more than 400 young people to automobile merchants, automotive mechatronics (automotive mechanics and auto electricians), coachbuilders, painters and specialists for warehouse logistics.

The management consists of Nicholas J. Dunning 2015 (Chairman), Harald Ferry, Markus and Jürgen Ludewig Schönbrunn. The Management Board of Heinrich Weiss (Chairman), Alexander Glassmakers, Felix Goedhart, Peter J. Henssen, Martin Kirschner and Robert Rademacher. The latter, the company had passed since the early 1970s and since 2005 after retiring from active work - as well as Gottfried Schultz in the 1960s - President of the Central Association of the German Motor Trade (ZDK).

References

Volkswagen Group
Companies based in North Rhine-Westphalia